Kayode Ted Adams (died October 1969) was a student activist at the University of Lagos (UNILAG) who became controversial in 1965 after stabbing then-Vice Chancellor (VC) of the University of Lagos, Saburi Biobaku.

Attack on Saburi Biobaku
Following the non-renewal of Prof Eni Njoku's term as VC of UNILAG, Prof Saburi Biobaku was appointed VC by the government of Sir Abubakar Tafawa Balewa, then Prime Minister of Nigeria. The decision was unpopular with UNILAG students who felt ethnic favoritism informed Biobaku's appointment. During Biobaku's outreach to the UNILAG community in June 1965, Kayode Adams approached the podium and stabbed Biobaku in the back. Biobaku was rushed to a UNILAG medical center where he was treated for his wounds while the Nigerian Police arrested Adams. UNILAG was shut down for months following the stabbing incident because of resulting tensions.

Trial
Adams was arraigned for stabbing Biobaku, raised a defense of insanity, and pleaded not guilty. Despite his insanity defense, Adams was found guilty of attempted murder, confined  to the Yaba Psychiatric Hospital, and rusticated from UNILAG.

Death
Adams was found dead at Bar Beach, presumably from drowning in October 1969.

References 

1969 deaths
University of Lagos alumni
20th-century births
Nigerian activists